Jacob ben Aaron Sasportas (1610 – April 15, 1698), was a Rabbi, Kabbalist, and anti-Sabbatean. He was the father of Isaac ben Jacob Sasportas.

Sasportas was born at Oran. He became rabbi successively of Tlemcen (at the age of twenty-four), Marrakesh, Fes, and Salé. In about 1646 he was imprisoned by the Moorish king, but succeeded in escaping with his family to Amsterdam (ca. 1653). He stayed there till the disorders in Africa ceased, when he was called back by the King of Morocco and sent on a special mission to the Spanish court (ca. 1659) to ask for aid against the rebels. On his return he was invited to the rabbinate of the Portuguese community of London (1664). According to David Franco Mendes (in Ha-Meassef, 1788, p. 169), Jacob had accompanied Menasseh ben Israel to London in 1655. Owing to the outbreak of the plague in London in 1665, Jacob went to Hamburg, where he officiated as rabbi till 1673. In that year he was called to Amsterdam and appointed head of the yeshiva Keter Torah, founded by the brothers Pinto. Two years later he became dayyan and head of the yeshiva at Livorno, and in 1680 he returned to Amsterdam, where he was appointed head of the yeshiva 'Eitz Hayyim. After the death of Isaac Aboab da Fonseca (1693) he was appointed rabbi of the Portuguese community, which office he held till his death at Amsterdam.

Jacob was one of the most violent antagonists of the Shabbethaian movement; he wrote many letters to various communities in Europe, Asia, and Africa, exhorting them to unmask the impostors and to warn the people against them.

Grätz ("Gesch." x., note 2) identifies Jacob Sasportas with Jaho Saportas, who competed with the Cansinos for the office of interpreter at the Spanish court (Jacob Cansino's preface to Moses Almosnino's "Extremos y Grandezas de Constantinople," Madrid, 1638). His works had a great influence on Aaron ben Samuel.

Works
Toledot Ya'akov (Amsterdam, 1652), an index of Biblical passages found in the haggadah of the Jerusalem Talmud, similar to Aaron Pesaro's "Toledot Aharon," which relates to the Babylonian Talmud only;
Ohel Ya'akov (ib. 1737), responsa, edited and prefaced by his son Abraham Sasportas;
 Tzitzat Novel Zvi (ib. 1737), polemical correspondence against Shabbethai Zevi and his followers, also edited by his son. The last-named work was afterward abridged and published under the title "Kitzur Tzitzat Novel Zvi" (Altona, n.d.).

Jacob edited the "Hekal ha-Kodesh" of Moses ben Maimun Albas, to which he added an introduction and supplied notes (Amsterdam, 1653).

Bibliography
Samuel Joseph Fuenn, Keneset Yisrael, p. 577; 
Julius Fürst, Bibl. Jud. iii.251; 
Heinrich Graetz, Gesch. 3d ed., x.204, 215, 217, 225-226, note 2; 
Meyer Kayserling, Bibl. Esp.-Port.-Jud. pp. 4, 8, 98-99; 
S. Rubin, in Magyar Zsidá Szemle, vii.711; 
Abraham Sasportas, preface to Ohel Ya'aḳob; 
Moritz Steinschneider, Cat. Bodl. col. 1254; 
S. Wiener, in Ha-Meliẓ, 1894, Nos. 203, 245; 
Cat. Anglo-Jew. Hist. Exh. p. 48; 
Johann Christoph Wolf, Bibliotheca Hebræa i.619.
Yaacob Dweck. Dissident Rabbi: The Life of Jacob Sasportas (Princeton University Press, 2019)

References

1610 births
1698 deaths
17th-century Moroccan rabbis
17th-century Algerian rabbis
People from Spanish Oran
Sephardi rabbis
Spanish expatriates in Morocco